New Hampshire Route 41 (abbreviated NH 41) is a  north–south state highway in east-central New Hampshire. It is the main road connecting Silver Lake with Ossipee. The highway skirts the western edge of the lake named Silver Lake and provides access to local roads at the lakeside.

NH 41, along with NH 113, provides an alternate to the often-congested NH 16 between Ossipee and Conway.

Route description
NH 41 begins in West Ossipee at an intersection with NH 16, just past its northern split with NH 25. NH 41 proceeds northeast, crossing through a small corner of southeastern Tamworth before entering the town of Madison. NH 41 turns due north and skirts the western edge of Silver Lake for a few miles before ending at NH 113 in the village of Silver Lake, near the lake's northern tip.

Junction list

References

041
Transportation in Carroll County, New Hampshire